The 2015 Philadelphia Phillies season was the 133rd season in the history of the franchise, and its twelfth season at Citizens Bank Park. The team finished the season with a record of 63–99 (.389), the worst record in the majors, and missed the playoffs for a fourth consecutive season.

Offseason
Players becoming free agents
 A. J. Burnett – Signed with the Pittsburgh Pirates for one year. – 11/14/14
 Kyle Kendrick – Signed with the Colorado Rockies for one year. – 2/4/15
 Mike Adams – Signed a minor league contract with the Los Angeles Dodgers. – 3/1/15
 Wil Nieves – Signed a minor league deal with the San Diego Padres. – 2/4/15

Trades and signings
October 21, 2014 – Re-signed pitcher Jerome Williams to a one-year deal.
October 23, 2014 – Re-signed Grady Sizemore to a one-year deal.
December 10, 2014 – Traded Antonio Bastardo to the Pittsburgh Pirates for Joely Rodriguez.
December 19, 2014 – Traded Jimmy Rollins and cash to the Los Angeles Dodgers for minor leaguers Tom Windle and Zach Eflin.
December 31, 2014 – Traded Marlon Byrd and cash to the Cincinnati Reds for RHP Ben Lively.
January 5, 2015 – Signed Aaron Harang to a one-year deal worth $5 million, that included performance bonuses.
January 29, 2015 – Signed Chad Billingsley to a one-year deal.

Broadcasting changes
After only one season, Jamie Moyer departed the Phillies' broadcast booth. Comcast SportsNet hired Ben Davis, previously a pre-game and post-game analyst, to replace Moyer as a game analyst, working with Matt Stairs (another analyst), Tom McCarthy (play-by-play), Gregg Murphy (field reporter), and Mike Schmidt (analyst for weekend home games).

Season standings

National League East

National League Wild Card

Record vs. opponents

Game log

|- style="background:#fbb"
| 1 || April 6 || Red Sox || 0–8 || Clay Buchholz (1–0) || Cole Hamels (0–1) || — || 45,549 || 0–1
|- style="background:#bfb"
| 2 || April 8 || Red Sox || 4–2 || Aaron Harang (1–0) || Rick Porcello (0–1) || Jonathan Papelbon (1) || 26,465 || 1–1
|- style="background:#fbb"
| 3 || April 9 || Red Sox || 2–6 || Justin Masterson (1–0) || David Buchanan (0–1) || — || 23,418 || 1–2
|- style="background:#bfb"
| 4 || April 10 || Nationals || 4–1 || Luis García (1–0) || Gio González (0–1) ||Jonathan Papelbon (2)  || 19,047 || 2–2
|- style="background:#bfb"
| 5 || April 11 || Nationals || 3–2 (10) || Dustin McGowan (1–0) || Tanner Roark (0–1) || — || 23,740 || 3–2
|- style="background:#fbb"
| 6 || April 12 || Nationals || 3–4 (10) || Aaron Barrett (1–0) || Jake Diekman (0–1) || Drew Storen (2) || 30,094 || 3–3
|- style="background:#fbb"
| 7 || April 13 || @ Mets || 0–2 || Jacob deGrom (1–1) || Aaron Harang (1–1) || Jeurys Familia (2) || 43,947 || 3–4
|- style="background:#fbb"
| 8 || April 14 || @ Mets || 5–6 || Matt Harvey (2–0) || David Buchanan (0–2) || Jeurys Familia (3) || 38,849 || 3–5
|- style="background:#fbb"
| 9 || April 15 || @ Mets || 1–6 || Jon Niese (1–0) || Jerome Williams (0–1) || — || 21,052 || 3–6
|- style="background:#fbb"
| 10 || April 16 || @ Nationals || 2–5 || Doug Fister (1–0) || Cole Hamels (0–2) || Drew Storen (3) || 24,768 || 3–7
|- style="background:#fbb"
| 11 || April 17 || @ Nationals || 2–7 || Max Scherzer (1–1) || Sean O'Sullivan (0–1) || — || 31,608 || 3–8
|- style="background:#bfb"
| 12 || April 18 || @ Nationals || 5–3 || Aaron Harang (2–1) || Jordan Zimmermann (1–2) || Jonathan Papelbon (3) || 35,330 || 4–8
|- style="background:#fbb"
| 13 || April 19 || @ Nationals || 1–4 || Stephen Strasburg (1–1) || David Buchanan (0–3) || Drew Storen (4) || 36,631 || 4–9
|- style="background:#bfb"
| 14 || April 21 || Marlins || 7–3 || Jerome Williams (1–1) || Dan Haren (1–1) || — || 21,993 || 5–9
|- style="background:#fbb"
| 15 || April 22 || Marlins || 1–6 || Jarred Cosart (1–1) || Luis García (1–1) || — || 23,417 || 5–10
|- style="background:#fbb"
| 16 || April 23 || Marlins || 1–9 || David Phelps (1–0) || Dustin McGowan (1–1) || — || 17,097 || 5–11
|- style="background:#bfb"
| 17 || April 24 || Braves || 1–0 || Ken Giles (1–0) || Jim Johnson (1–2) || — || 21,164 || 6–11
|- style="background:#fbb"
| 18 || April 25 || Braves || 2–5 || Shelby Miller (3–0) || David Buchanan (0–4) || Jason Grilli (7) || 24,748 || 6–12
|- style="background:#bfb"
| 19 || April 26 || Braves || 5–4 || Jerome Williams (2–1) || Trevor Cahill (0–3) || Jonathan Papelbon (4) || 28,702 || 7–12
|- style="background:#bfb"
| 20 || April 27 || @ Cardinals || 4–1 || Cole Hamels (1–2) || John Lackey (1–1) || Jonathan Papelbon (5) || 40,052 || 8–12
|- style="background:#fbb"
| 21 || April 28 || @ Cardinals || 5–11 || Michael Wacha (4–0) || Severino González (0–1) || — || 40,143 || 8–13
|- style="background:#fbb"
| 22 || April 29 || @ Cardinals || 2–5 || Carlos Martínez (3–0) || Aaron Harang (2–2) || Trevor Rosenthal (8) || 40,399 || 8–14
|- style="background:#fbb"
| 23 || April 30 || @ Cardinals || 3–9 || Carlos Villanueva (2–1) || David Buchanan (0–5) || — || 40,715 || 8–15
|-

|- style="background:#fbb"
| 24 || May 1 || @ Marlins || 3–4 || Steve Cishek (1–1) || Ken Giles (1–1) || — || 18,511 || 8–16
|- style="background:#fbb"
| 25 || May 2 || @ Marlins || 0–7 || Dan Haren (3–1) || Cole Hamels (1–3) || — || 33,348 || 8–17
|- style="background:#bfb"
| 26 || May 3 || @ Marlins || 6–2 || Severino González (1–1) || Jarred Cosart (1–2) || — || 20,461 || 9–17
|- style="background:#bfb"
| 27 || May 4 || @ Braves || 5–2 || Aaron Harang (3–2) || Alex Wood (1–2) || — || 17,293 || 10–17
|- style="background:#fbb"
| 28 || May 5 || @ Braves || 0–9 || Shelby Miller (4–1) || Chad Billingsley (0–1) || — || 14,451 || 10–18
|- style="background:#fbb"
| 29 || May 6 || @ Braves || 5–7 || Mike Foltynewicz (2–0) || Jerome Williams (2–2) || Jason Grilli (9) || 17,772 || 10–19
|- style="background:#bfb"
| 30 || May 8 || Mets || 3–1 || Cole Hamels (2–3) || Matt Harvey (5–1) || Jonathan Papelbon (6) || 32,734 || 11–19
|- style="background:#fbb"
| 31 || May 9 || Mets || 2–3 || Jon Niese (3–2) || Aaron Harang (3–3) || Jeurys Familia (12) || 29,373 || 11–20
|- style="background:#fbb"
| 32 || May 10 || Mets || 4–7 || Bartolo Colón (6–1) || Chad Billingsley (0–2) || Jeurys Familia (13) || 27,935 || 11–21
|- style="background:#fbb"
| 33 || May 11 || Pirates || 3–4 || Gerrit Cole (5–1) || Jerome Williams (2–3) || Mark Melancon (8) || 21,358 || 11–22
|- style="background:#fbb"
| 34 || May 12 || Pirates || 2–7 || A. J. Burnett (2–1) || Sean O'Sullivan (0–2) || — || 20,393 || 11–23
|- style="background:#bfb"
| 35 || May 13 || Pirates || 3–2 || Cole Hamels (3–3) || Francisco Liriano (1–3) || Jonathan Papelbon (7) || 29,576 || 12–23
|- style="background:#bfb"
| 36 || May 14 || Pirates || 4–2 || Aaron Harang (4–3) || Vance Worley (2–3) || Jonathan Papelbon (8) || 29,205 || 13–23
|- style="background:#bfb"
| 37 || May 15 || Diamondbacks || 4–3 || Elvis Araújo (1–0) || Óliver Pérez (1–1) || Luis García (1) || 21,383 || 14–23
|- style="background:#bfb"
| 38 || May 16 || Diamondbacks || 7–5 || Jerome Williams (3–3) || Archie Bradley (2–1) || Jonathan Papelbon (9) || 33,649 || 15–23
|- style="background:#bfb"
| 39 || May 17 || Diamondbacks || 6–0 || Sean O'Sullivan (1–2) || Josh Collmenter (3–5) || — || 22,123 || 16–23
|- style="background:#bfb"
| 40 || May 18 || @ Rockies || 4–3 || Cole Hamels (4–3) || Jordan Lyles (2–4) || Jonathan Papelbon (10) || 24,061 || 17–23
|- style="background:#fbb"
| 41 || May 19 || @ Rockies || 5–6 || Scott Oberg (2–1) || Justin De Fratus (0–1) || John Axford (5) || 21,249 || 17–24
|- style="background:#bfb"
| 42 || May 20 || @ Rockies || 4–2 || Severino González (2–1) || Eddie Butler (2–5) ||  Jonathan Papelbon (11) || 21,714 || 18–24
|- style="background:#fbb"
| 43 || May 21 || @ Rockies || 3–7 || Christian Bergman (2–0) || Jerome Williams (3–4) || — || 25,418 || 18–25
|- style="background:#fbb"
| 44 || May 22 || @ Nationals || 1–2 || Max Scherzer (5–3) || Sean O'Sullivan (1–3) || Drew Storen (13) || 35,893 || 18–26
|- style="background:#bfb"
| 45 || May 23 || @ Nationals || 8–1 || Cole Hamels (5–3) || Stephen Strasburg (3–6) || — || 41,722 || 19–26
|- style="background:#fbb"
| 46 || May 24 || @ Nationals || 1–4 || Gio González (4–2) || Aaron Harang (4–4) || Drew Storen (14) || 41,044 || 19–27
|- style="background:#fbb"
| 47 || May 25 || @ Mets || 3–6 || Bartolo Colón (7–3) || Elvis Araújo (1–1) || Jeurys Familia (14) || 30,946 || 19–28
|- style="background:#fbb"
| 48 || May 26 || @ Mets || 4–5 (10) || Jeurys Familia (1–0) || Jeanmar Gómez (0–1) || — || 21,064 || 19–29
|- style="background:#fbb"
| 49 || May 27 || @ Mets || 0–7 || Noah Syndergaard (2–2) || Sean O'Sullivan (1–4) || — || 24,406 || 19–30
|- style="background:#fbb"
| 50 || May 29 || Rockies || 1–4 || Chad Bettis (2–0) || Cole Hamels (5–4) || — || 22,227 || 19–31
|- style="background:#fbb"
| 51 || May 30 || Rockies || 2–5 || Eddie Butler (3–5) || Aaron Harang (4–5) || John Axford (9) || 23,510 || 19–32
|- style="background:#fbb"
| 52 || May 31 || Rockies || 1–4 || Chris Rusin (1–0) || Jerome Williams (3–5) || Scott Oberg (1) || 22,166 || 19–33
|-

|- style="background:#bfb"
| 53 || June 2 || Reds || 5–4 || Jonathan Papelbon (1–0) || Tony Cingrani (0–2) || — || 20,209 || 20–33
|- style="background:#bfb"
| 54 || June 3 || Reds || 5–4 (11) || Luis García (2–1) || Ryan Mattheus (0–1) || — || 21,253 || 21–33
|- style="background:#fbb"
| 55 || June 4 || Reds || 4–6 || Anthony DeSclafani (4–4) || Aaron Harang (4–6) || Aroldis Chapman (10) || 21,057 || 21–34
|- style="background:#fbb"
| 56 || June 5 || Giants || 4–5 || Tim Lincecum (6–3) || Luis García (2–2) || Santiago Casilla (16) || 20,638 || 21–35
|- style="background:#fbb"
| 57 || June 6 || Giants || 5–7 || Madison Bumgarner (7–2) || Severino González (2–2) || Santiago Casilla (15) || 29,102 || 21–36
|- style="background:#bfb"
| 58 || June 7 || Giants || 6–4 || Ken Giles (2–1) || Ryan Vogelsong (4–4) || Jonathan Papelbon (12) || 24,799 || 22–36
|- style="background:#fbb"
| 59 || June 8 || @ Reds || 4–6 || Mike Leake (3–4) || Cole Hamels (5–5) || Aroldis Chapman (11) || 30,900 || 22–37
|- style="background:#fbb"
| 60 || June 9 || @ Reds || 2–11 || Anthony DeSclafani (5–4) || Aaron Harang (4–7) || — || 27,993 || 22–38
|- style="background:#fbb"
| 61 || June 10 || @ Reds || 2–5 || Jon Moscot (1–1) || Jerome Williams (3–6) || Aroldis Chapman (12) || 32,994 || 22–39
|- style="background:#fbb"
| 62 || June 12 || @ Pirates || 0–1 (13) || Antonio Bastardo (1–1) || Dustin McGowan (1–2) || — || 33,749 || 22–40
|- style="background:#fbb"
| 63 || June 13 || @ Pirates || 3–4 || Gerrit Cole (10–2) || Sean O'Sullivan (1–5) || Mark Melancon (20) || 37,516 || 22–41
|- style="background:#fbb"
| 64 || June 14 || @ Pirates || 0–1 (11) || Antonio Bastardo (2–1) || Jonathan Papelbon (1–1) || — || 34,518 || 22–42
|- style="background:#fbb"
| 65 || June 15 || @ Orioles || 0–4 || Wei-Yin Chen (3–4) || Aaron Harang (4–8) || — || 23,730 || 22–43
|- style="background:#fbb"
| 66 || June 16 || @ Orioles || 3–19 || Chris Tillman (5–7) || Jerome Williams (3–7) || — || 26,964 || 22–44
|- style="background:#fbb"
| 67 || June 17 || Orioles || 4–6 || Ubaldo Jiménez (5–3) || Kevin Correia (0–1) || Zach Britton (18) || 26,162 || 22–45
|- style="background:#bfb"
| 68 || June 18 || Orioles || 2–1 || Jake Diekman (1–1) || Bud Norris (2–5) || Jonathan Papelbon (13) || 26,220 || 23–45
|- style="background:#fbb"
| 69 || June 19 || Cardinals || 4–12 || Tyler Lyons (2–0) || Phillippe Aumont (0–1) || — || 21,169 || 23–46
|- style="background:#fbb"
| 70 || June 20 || Cardinals || 1–10 || John Lackey (6–4) || Aaron Harang (4–9) || — || 24,256 || 23–47
|- style="background:#bfb"
| 71 || June 21 || Cardinals || 9–2 || Adam Morgan (1–0) || Michael Wacha (9–3) || — || 30,423 || 24–47
|- style="background:#bfb"
| 72 || June 22 || @ Yankees || 11–8 || Jake Diekman (2–1) || Michael Pineda (8–4) || — || 36,883 || 25–47
|- style="background:#bfb"
| 73 || June 23 || @ Yankees || 11–6 || Ken Giles (3–1) || Dellin Betances (4–1) || — || 36,198 || 26–47
|- style="background:#fbb"
| 74 || June 24 || @ Yankees || 2–10 || Iván Nova (1–0) || Cole Hamels (5–6) || — || 45,877 || 26–48
|- style="background:#fbb"
| 75 || June 26 || Nationals || 2–5 || Max Scherzer (9–5) || Aaron Harang (4–10) || Drew Storen (22) || 22,292 || 26–49
|- style="background:#bbb"
| – || June 27 || Nationals || colspan=6 | Postponed (rain) Rescheduled for June 28 as part of a doubleheader
|- style="background:#fbb"
| 76 || June 28 (1) || Nationals || 2–3 || Stephen Strasburg (5–5) || Kevin Correia (0–2) || Drew Storen (23) || see 2nd game || 26–50
|- style="background:#bfb"
| 77 || June 28 (2) || Nationals || 8–5 || Severino González (3–2) || Tanner Roark (3–3) || Jonathan Papelbon (14) || 27,126 || 27–50
|- style="background:#fbb"
| 78 || June 29 || Brewers || 4–7 || Jimmy Nelson (5–8) || Sean O'Sullivan (1–6) || Francisco Rodríguez (16) || 18,423 || 27–51
|- style="background:#fbb"
| 79 || June 30 || Brewers || 3–4 || Neal Cotts (1–0) || Ken Giles (3–2) || Francisco Rodríguez (17) || 20,564 || 27–52
|-

|- style="background:#fbb"
| 80 || July 1 || Brewers || 5–9 || Kyle Lohse (5–9) || Aaron Harang (4–11) || — || 27,069 || 27–53
|- style="background:#fbb"
| 81 || July 2 || Brewers || 7–8 (11) || Michael Blazek (5–2) || Luis García (2–3) || Francisco Rodríguez (18) || 30,485 || 27–54
|- style="background:#fbb"
| 82 || July 3 || @ Braves || 1–2 || Julio Teherán (6–4) || Adam Morgan (1–1) || Jim Johnson (5) || 33,090 || 27–55
|- style="background:#fbb"
| 83 || July 4 || @ Braves || 5–9 || Alex Wood (6–5) || Kevin Correia (0–3) || — || 34,401 || 27–56
|- style="background:#bfb"
| 84 || July 5 || @ Braves || 4–0 (10) || Luis García (3–3) || Nick Masset (2–2) || — || 18,763 || 28–56
|- style="background:#fbb"
| 85 || July 6 || @ Dodgers || 7–10 || J. P. Howell (4–1) || Jeanmar Gómez (0–2) || Kenley Jansen (14) || 45,180 || 28–57
|- style="background:#bfb"
| 86 || July 7 || @ Dodgers || 7–2 || Chad Billingsley (1–2) || Brett Anderson (5–5) || — || 46,614 || 29–57
|- style="background:#fbb"
| 87 || July 8 || @ Dodgers || 0–5 || Clayton Kershaw (6–6) || Adam Morgan (1–2) || — || 45,135 || 29–58
|- style="background:#fbb"
| 88 || July 9 || @ Dodgers || 0–6 || Zack Greinke (8–2) || Severino González (3–3) || — || 41,290 || 29–59
|- style="background:#fbb"
| 89 || July 10 || @ Giants || 2–15 || Madison Bumgarner (9–5) || Cole Hamels (5–7) || — || 41,895 || 29–60
|- style="background:#fbb"
| 90 || July 11 || @ Giants || 5–8 || Josh Osich (1–0) || Luis García (3–4) || Santiago Casilla (22) || 41,980 || 29–61
|- style="background:#fbb"
| 91 || July 12 || @ Giants || 2–4 || Chris Heston (9–5) || Chad Billingsley (1–3) || Santiago Casilla (23) || 42,387 || 29–62
|- style="background:#bbcaff;"
| – || July 14 ||colspan="7" |2015 Major League Baseball All-Star Game at Great American Ball Park in Cincinnati
|- style="background:#bfb"
| 92 || July 17 || Marlins || 6–3 || Ken Giles (4–2) || Bryan Morris (3–2) || — || 23,074 || 30–62
|- style="background:#bfb"
| 93 || July 18 || Marlins || 3–1 || Chad Billingsley (2–3) || Tom Koehler (7–6) || Jonathan Papelbon (15) || 23,655 || 31–62
|- style="background:#bfb"
| 94 || July 19 || Marlins || 8–7 || Héctor Neris (1–0) || A. J. Ramos (0–2) || — || 21,739 || 32–62
|- style="background:#bfb"
| 95 || July 20 || Rays || 5–3 || David Buchanan (1–5) || Matt Moore (1–1) || Jonathan Papelbon (16) || 20,148 || 33–62
|- style="background:#fbb"
| 96 || July 21 || Rays || 0–1 || Nathan Karns (5–5) || Aaron Nola (0–1) || Brad Boxberger (24) || 28,703 || 33–63
|- style="background:#bfb"
| 97 || July 22 || Rays || 5–4 (10) || Jonathan Papelbon (2–1) || Brad Boxberger (4–6) || — || 22,252 || 34–63
|- style="background:#bfb"
| 98 || July 24 || @ Cubs || 5–3 (10) || Ken Giles (5–2) || James Russell (0–2) || Jonathan Papelbon (17) || 41,230 || 35–63
|- style="background:#bfb"
| 99 || July 25 || @ Cubs || 5–0 || Cole Hamels (6–7) || Jake Arrieta (11–6) || — || 41,683 || 36–63
|- style="background:#bfb"
| 100 || July 26 || @ Cubs || 11–5 || Aaron Nola (1–1) || Jason Hammel (5–5) || — || 41,123 || 37–63
|- style="background:#bfb"
| 101 || July 28 || @ Blue Jays || 3–2 || Adam Morgan (2–2) || Félix Doubront (1–1) || Ken Giles (1) || 30,516 || 38–63
|- style="background:#fbb"
| 102 || July 29 || @ Blue Jays || 2–8 || R. A. Dickey (5–10) || Jerome Williams (3–8) || — || 27,060 || 38–64
|- style="background:#bfb"
| 103 || July 30 || Braves || 4–1 || Aaron Harang (5–11) || Shelby Miller (5–8) || Ken Giles (2) || 21,706 || 39–64
|- style="background:#bfb"
| 104 || July 31 || Braves || 9–3 || David Buchanan (2–5) || Williams Pérez (4–1) || — || 29,290 || 40–64
|-

|- style="background:#bfb"
| 105 || August 1 || Braves || 12–2 || Aaron Nola (2–1) || Matt Wisler (5–2) || — || 25,523 || 41–64
|- style="background:#fbb"
| 106 || August 2 || Braves || 2–6 || Julio Teherán (7–6) || Adam Morgan (2–3) || — || 24,361 || 41–65
|- style="background:#bfb"
| 107 || August 4 || Dodgers || 6–2 || Jeanmar Gómez (1–2) || Alex Wood (7–7) || Ken Giles (3) || 28,733 || 42–65
|- style="background:#fbb"
| 108 || August 5 || Dodgers || 3–4 || Brett Anderson (6–6) || Aaron Harang (5–12) || Kenley Jansen (20) || 26,197 || 42–66
|- style="background:#fbb"
| 109 || August 6 || Dodgers || 8–10 || Zack Greinke (11–2) || David Buchanan (2–6) || Kenley Jansen (21) || 27,839 || 42–67
|- style="background:#bfb"
| 110 || August 7 || @ Padres || 4–3 (12) || Héctor Neris (2–0) || Kevin Quackenbush (1–2) || Ken Giles (4) || 31,334 || 43–67
|- style="background:#bfb"
| 111 || August 8 || @ Padres || 4–2 || Adam Morgan (3–3) || Tyson Ross (8–9) || Ken Giles (5) || 44,567 || 44–67
|- style="background:#bfb"
| 112 || August 9 || @ Padres || 5–3 || Jerome Williams (4–8) || Andrew Cashner (4–12) || Ken Giles (6) || 24,156 || 45–67
|- style="background:#fbb"
| 113 || August 10 || @ Diamondbacks || 3–13 || Rubby De La Rosa (10–5) || Aaron Harang (5–13) || — || 16,495 || 45–68
|- style="background:#fbb"
| 114 || August 11 || @ Diamondbacks || 1–13 || Jeremy Hellickson (8–8) || David Buchanan (2–7) || — || 19,836 || 45–69
|- style="background:#bfb"
| 115 || August 12 || @ Diamondbacks || 7–6 || Aaron Nola (3–1) || Chase Anderson (5–5) || Ken Giles (7) || 18,047 || 46–69
|- style="background:#fbb"
| 116 || August 14 || @ Brewers || 1–3 || Wily Peralta (3–7) || Adam Morgan (3–4) || Francisco Rodríguez (27) || 34,735 || 46–70
|- style="background:#fbb"
| 117 || August 15 || @ Brewers || 2–4 || Will Smith (6–2) || Justin De Fratus (0–2) || Francisco Rodríguez (28) || 39,204 || 46–71
|- style="background:#fbb"
| 118 || August 16 || @ Brewers || 1–6 || Taylor Jungmann (7–4) || Aaron Harang (5–14) || Francisco Rodríguez (29) || 33,920 || 46–72
|- style="background:#fbb"
| 119 || August 18 || Blue Jays || 5–8 || Liam Hendriks (4–0) || Jeanmar Gómez (1–3) || Roberto Osuna (14) || 26,547 || 46–73
|- style="background:#bfb"
| 120 || August 19 || Blue Jays || 7–4 || Adam Morgan (4–4) || Mark Buehrle (13–6) || Ken Giles (8) || 26,246 || 47–73
|- style="background:#fbb"
| 121 || August 20 || @ Marlins || 7–9 || Brad Hand (3–3) || Jerome Williams (4–9) || A. J. Ramos (21) || 19,689 || 47–74
|- style="background:#bfb"
| 122 || August 21 || @ Marlins || 7–1 || Jerad Eickhoff (1–0) || Kendry Flores (1–2) || — || 19,391 || 48–74
|- style="background:#bfb"
| 123 || August 22 || @ Marlins || 4–2 || Elvis Araújo (2–1) || A. J. Ramos (1–4) || Ken Giles (9) || 22,113 || 49–74
|- style="background:#bfb"
| 124 || August 23 || @ Marlins || 2–0 || Aaron Nola (4–1) || Adam Conley (1–1) || Ken Giles (10) || 22,693 || 50–74
|- style="background:#fbb"
| 125 || August 24 || Mets || 7–16 || Sean Gilmartin (3–1) || Héctor Neris (2–1) || — || 23,744 || 50–75
|- style="background:#fbb"
| 126 || August 25 || Mets || 5–6 || Noah Syndergaard (8–6) || Jerome Williams (4–10) || Jeurys Familia (34) || 23,544 || 50–76
|- style="background:#fbb"
| 127 || August 26 || Mets || 4–9 || Bartolo Colón (11–11) || Jerad Eickhoff (1–1) || Tyler Clippard (19) || 22,184 || 50–77
|- style="background:#fbb"
| 128 || August 27 || Mets || 5–9 || Carlos Torres (5–5) || Héctor Neris (2–2) || — || 22,526 || 50–78
|- style="background:#bfb"
| 129 || August 28 || Padres || 7–1 || Aaron Nola (5–1) || Ian Kennedy (8–12) || Jerome Williams (1) || 25,145 || 51–78
|- style="background:#bfb"
| 130 || August 29 || Padres || 4–3 || Adam Morgan (5–4) || Colin Rea (2–2) || Ken Giles (11) || 22,090 || 52–78
|- style="background:#fbb"
| 131 || August 30 || Padres || 4–9 || James Shields (10–6) || Alec Asher (0–1) || — || 22,624 || 52–79
|- style="background:#fbb"
| 132 || August 31 || @ Mets || 1–3 || Bartolo Colón (12–11) || Jerad Eickhoff (1–2) || Jeurys Familia (36) || 34,233 || 52–80
|-

|- style="background:#bfb"
| 133 || September 1 || @ Mets || 14–8 || Jeanmar Gómez (2–3) || Jon Niese (8–10) || — || 30,104 || 53–80
|- style="background:#fbb"
| 134 || September 2 || @ Mets || 4–9 || Matt Harvey (12–7) || Aaron Nola (5–2) || — || 32,464 || 53–81
|- style="background:#fbb"
| 135 || September 4 || @ Red Sox || 5–7 || Joe Kelly (9–6) || Adam Morgan (5–5) || Robbie Ross, Jr. (1) || 33,674 || 53–82
|- style="background:#fbb"
| 136 || September 5 || @ Red Sox || 2–9 || Wade Miley (11–10) || Alec Asher (0–2) || — || 36,534 || 53–83
|- style="background:#fbb"
| 137 || September 6 || @ Red Sox || 2–6 || Eduardo Rodríguez (9–5) || Jerad Eickhoff (1–3) || — || 34,708 || 53–84
|- style="background:#fbb"
| 138 || September 7 || Braves || 2–7 || Williams Pérez (5–6) || Aaron Harang (5–15) || — || 15,125 || 53–85
|- style="background:#bfb"
| 139 || September 8 || Braves || 5–0 || Aaron Nola (6–2) || Ryan Weber (0–1) || Ken Giles (12) || 15,610 || 54–85
|- style="background:#fbb"
| 140 || September 9 || Braves || 1–8 || Julio Teherán (10–7) || David Buchanan (2–8) || — || 15,241 || 54–86
|- style="background:#bbb"
| – || September 10 || Cubs || colspan=6 | Postponed (rain) Rescheduled for September 11 as part of a doubleheader
|- style="background:#fbb"
| 141 || September 11 (1) || Cubs || 1–5 || Jake Arrieta (19–6) || Adam Morgan (5–6) || — || see 2nd game || 54–87
|- style="background:#fbb"
| 142 || September 11 (2) || Cubs || 3–7 || Kyle Hendricks (7–6) || Alec Asher (0–3) || Héctor Rondón (28) || 22,538 || 54–88
|- style="background:#bfb"
| 143 || September 12 || Cubs || 7–5 || Ken Giles (6–2) || Héctor Rondón (5–4) || — || 20,813 || 55–88
|- style="background:#bfb"
| 144 || September 13 || Cubs || 7–4 || Dalier Hinojosa (1–0) || Clayton Richard (3–2) || Ken Giles (13) || 23,450 || 56–88
|- style="background:#fbb"
| 145 || September 14 || Nationals || 7–8 (11) || Jonathan Papelbon (4–2) || Luis García (3–5) || Doug Fister (1) || 15,402 || 56–89
|- style="background:#fbb"
| 146 || September 15 || Nationals || 0–4 || Stephen Strasburg (9–7) || David Buchanan (2–9) || — || 15,325 || 56–90
|- style="background:#fbb"
| 147 || September 16 || Nationals || 2–12 || Gio González (11–7) || Alec Asher (0–4) || — || 15,753 || 56–91
|- style="background:#fbb"
| 148 || September 18 || @ Braves || 1–2 || Williams Pérez (6–6) || Adam Morgan (5–7) || Arodys Vizcaíno (5) || 22,525 || 56–92
|- style="background:#fbb"
| 149 || September 19 || @ Braves || 1–2 || Edwin Jackson (3–3) || Jerome Williams (4–11) || Arodys Vizcaíno (6) || 24,855 || 56–93
|- style="background:#fbb"
| 150 || September 20 || @ Braves || 1–2 || Peter Moylan (1–0) || Luis García (3–6) || — || 23,723 || 56–94
|- style="background:#bfb"
| 151 || September 22 || @ Marlins || 6–2 || Aaron Harang (6–15) || Tom Koehler (10–14) || — || 16,742 || 57–94
|- style="background:#fbb"
| 152 || September 23 || @ Marlins || 3–4 (11) || Brian Ellington (2–1) || Jerome Williams (4–12) || — || 15,662 || 57–95
|- style="background:#fbb"
| 153 || September 24 || @ Marlins || 0–1 || Bryan Morris (5–3) || Alec Asher (0–5) || A. J. Ramos (29) || 17,083 || 57–96
|- style="background:#bfb"
| 154 || September 25 || @ Nationals || 8–2 || Jerad Eickhoff (2–3) || Jordan Zimmermann (13–9) || — || 31,019 || 58–96
|- style="background:#fbb"
| 155 || September 26 || @ Nationals || 1–2 (12) || Matt Thornton (2–1) || Colton Murray (0–1) || — || 32,086 || 58–97
|- style="background:#bfb"
| 156 || September 27 || @ Nationals || 12–5 || Dalier Hinojosa (2–0) || Jonathan Papelbon (4–3) || — || 28,661 || 59–97
|- style="background:#bfb"
| 157 || September 29 || Mets || 4–3 || Adam Loewen (1–0) || Bartolo Colón (14–13) || Ken Giles (14) || 15,227 || 60–97
|- style="background:#bfb"
| 158 || September 30 || Mets || 7–5 || Ken Roberts (1–1) || Bobby Parnell (2–4) || Ken Giles (15) || 15,201 || 61–97
|-

|- style="background:#bfb"
| 159 || October 1 || Mets || 3–0 || Jerad Eickhoff (3–3) || Sean Gilmartin (3–2) || Luis García (2) || 13,238 || 62–97
|- style="background:#bbb"
| – || October 2 || Marlins || colspan=6 | Postponed (rain) Rescheduled for October 3 as part of a doubleheader
|- style="background:#fbb"
| 160 || October 3 (1) || Marlins || 6–7 || Chris Narveson (3–1) || Ken Giles (6–3) || A. J. Ramos (31) || see 2nd game || 62–98
|- style="background:#fbb"
| 161 || October 3 (2) || Marlins || 2–5 || Justin Nicolino (5–4) || Alec Asher (0–6) || A. J. Ramos (32) || 16,240 || 62–99
|- style="background:#bfb"
| 162 || October 4 || Marlins || 7–2 || Luis García (4–6) || André Rienzo (0–1) || — || 21,734 || 63–99
|-

Roster
All players who made an appearance for the Phillies during 2015 are included.

Season notes

Spring training
The Phillies entered spring training with rather low expectations for the upcoming season; in fact, Baseball Prospectus projected the Phillies would go 69–93, which would be the worst record in baseball. Even Phillies' front office personnel conceded that the Phillies were unlikely to be particularly competitive, although eventually, acting team president Pat Gillick suggested the team could hover around .500, depending on whether the team stays healthy, and whether it trades some of its better players such as Cole Hamels, Cliff Lee, or Jonathan Papelbon. Nevertheless, manager Ryne Sandberg expressed optimism at the team's chances, noting they might "surprise some people" in what he called a "transition" season rather than a "rebuilding" one. Among those transitions was at shortstop, where Freddy Galvis was expected to replace all-time Phillies' hits leader Jimmy Rollins. Also, the Phillies sought to piece together an outfield. Domonic Brown moved from left field to right field in the offseason, and Ben Revere was the presumptive starter in center field, which left several players vying for playing time as reserves and situational players. However, at one point Revere spent time in left field while Odubel Herrera played center field; Sandberg commented that Revere's arm may be a better fit in left, and that he was using spring training to experiment.

During spring training, the Phillies did not hit many home runs, which prompted Sandberg to note that throughout the season, the Phillies would play small ball to manufacture runs, especially via bunting and hit and run. As part of that strategy, Sandberg announced that both Revere and Herrera would make the opening day roster, with Revere playing left field and Herrera playing center.

Another key storyline for the Phillies was completing their starting rotation. Hamels, Lee, Aaron Harang, and Jerome Williams comprised the presumed first four in the rotation, but there was significant competition for the fifth starter spot. Among the leading candidates was David Buchanan, who looked to improve after a rookie campaign during which he posted a 6–8 record with a 3.75 earned run average (ERA), and struggled with surrendering home runs. Other candidates included Cuban import Miguel Alfredo Gonzalez, who had failed to live up to expectations after the Phillies signed him as an international free agent due to injuries, among other factors, and Chad Billingsley, who was still recovering from two right elbow surgeries. Late in spring training, after it became clear that Lee was going to miss significant time, the Phillies announced that Hamels, Harang, Williams, and Buchanan were their first four starters, and that there were both internal and external candidates to be the fifth starter. Hamels would start on opening day. On the last day of spring training, the Phillies signed relief pitcher Dustin McGowan who, despite a track record as a reliever, could potentially start if the Phillies needed him to while they awaited the return of Billingsley from the disabled list.

Ultimately, 12 pitchers, two catchers, seven infielders, and four outfielders comprised the Phillies opening day roster.Starting pitchers: David Buchanan, Aaron Harang, Cole Hamels, Jerome WilliamsRelief pitchers: Justin De Fratus, Luis Garcia, Ken Giles, Jeanmar Gómez, Dustin McGowan, Jonathan Papelbon, Jake Diekman, Cesar JimenezCatchers: Carlos Ruiz, Cameron RuppInfielders: Cody Asche, Andrés Blanco, Freddy Galvis, Cesar Hernandez, Ryan Howard, Darin Ruf, Chase UtleyOutfielders:' Jeff Francoeur, Odubel Herrera, Ben Revere, Grady Sizemore

April
After a "drubbing" on opening day in which the Phillies surrendered five home runs to lose 8–0 – their worst opening day shutout in team history – they rebounded to beat the Boston Red Sox in the series' second game behind a strong start from Aaron Harang that "closely emulated [the opening day starts] of the pitcher who made five consecutive opening-day starts for the Reds" before a loss in the rubber match during which David Buchanan pitched only three innings, allowing six runs, and snapping a streak of 16 starts in which Buchanan allowed three or fewer earned runs. Against the NL East favorite Washington Nationals, the Phillies won two of three, including a 10-inning bout in which Darin Ruf hit a home run, and Cody Asche had three hits.

The Phillies' third series of the year was against the New York Mets; both squads entered the series with a 3–3 record. Despite one game in which Chase Utley homered twice and another in which Odubel Herrera notched three extra-base hits, the Mets swept the Phillies. The team continued a road trip in Washington, and opened a four-game set with the Nationals by losing two, extending their losing streak to six games before beating the Nationals 5–3 thanks to strong offensive efforts from Herrera and Freddy Galvis, and a quality start from Harang. Unable to build momentum, the Phillies lost the series finale to drop their record to 4–9 on the season.

The Phillies entered their next series with the Marlins averaging only 2.46 runs per game, among the worst in the major leagues. However, they did win the first game of the series 7–3 thanks to home runs from Galvis and Ryan Howard, and a two-RBI triple from Ben Revere. The woeful offense manifested itself during the remainder of the series, as the squad mustered only two total runs, losing both games. The homestand continued with a series against the Atlanta Braves. After winning the first game 1–0 thanks to a strong start from Harang and a late-inning error by Freddie Freeman and losing the second game 5–2 with Buchanan's fourth loss of the season, the Phillies took the rubber match when Howard hit his second home run of the series (third of the season).

The team's final series of the month was a four-game set in St. Louis to face the Cardinals. Notwithstanding heating trade rumors including a potential deal to the Cardinals, Hamels picked up his first win of the season, leading the Phillies to a 4–1 victory. The next evening, Panamanian rookie Severino González made his major league debut, but was unsuccessful, relinquishing seven runs in 2 innings as the Phillies lost 11–5. The Phillies also lost the final two games, and finished the month of April with an 8–15 record, their worst April record since 2002.

The team's .223 batting average was also the worst in the National League; they also ranked last or tied for last in the NL in runs, runs per game, and home runs. The bullpen was markedly better than the starting rotation; the former ranked fourth in the NL in ERA, while the latter ranked 13th. As of the end of the month, Chase Utley had a .114 batting average, the worst in the major leagues. Meanwhile, Harang posted a rotation-leading 2.51 ERA in 32 innings pitched during the month, and was even mentioned as a potential candidate to be traded to a contending team.

May
The Phillies began the month by reshuffling their pitching staff, optioning David Buchanan (0–5, 8.76 ERA in April) to Triple-A Lehigh Valley, recalling Elvis Araújo (who conspicuously had similar struggles in the minor leagues), and preparing to add Chad Billingsley to the starting rotation.

StatisticsThrough October 4, 2015BattingNote: G = Games played; AB = At bats; R = Runs scored; H = Hits; 2B = Doubles; 3B = Triples; HR = Home runs; RBI = Runs batted in; BB = Base on balls; SO = Strikeouts; AVG = Batting average; SB = Stolen basesPitchingNote: W = Wins; L = Losses; ERA = Earned run average; G = Games pitched; GS = Games started; SV = Saves; IP = Innings pitched; H = Hits allowed; R = Runs allowed; ER = Earned runs allowed; HR = Home runs allowed; BB = Walks allowed; K = Strikeouts  

Farm system

Notes

External links
 2015 Philadelphia Phillies season at Baseball Reference''
 Philadelphia Phillies' official website

References

Philadelphia Phillies seasons
Philadelphia Phillies
Philadelphia Phillies